Leslie Raymond Austin (born 5 December 1936) was a rugby union player who represented Australia.

Austin, a prop, claimed 1 international rugby cap for Australia.

References

Australian rugby union players
Australia international rugby union players
1936 births
Living people
Rugby union props